Fatty Gets a Stylist is the first and only album by Australian band Fatty Gets a Stylist, composed of singer-songwriter Kate Miller-Heidke and her husband and songwriting partner Keir Nuttall. The album was released on 1 July 2011 and peaked at number 90 on the ARIA Albums Chart. In the US it was titled Liberty Bell and released as Miller-Heidke's third solo album. It was released in October 2011 and yielded two singles, "Are You Ready?", which achieved popularity after its use in a New York Lottery campaign and on advertisements for the Seven Network in Australia, and "Holloway Park".

Track listing

Charts

Release history

References

2011 albums
Kate Miller-Heidke albums